The Corson Emminger Round Barn near Watertown, South Dakota, United States, is a round barn that was built during 1909-1910 by Corson Emminger.  It was listed on the National Register of Historic Places in 1978.

It is "extremely tall", on a  diameter base.  It is built of concrete blocks.  It has a double-pitched roof topped by a polygonal cupola with a conical top.  It used to have ramps leading to two large entrances on the second level.

There are few round barns in South Dakota;  Emminger may have brought the idea of building one from Wisconsin, his native state, from which he arrived in the early 1900s.  He bought the farm property in 1905 for $6,000, and he built the barn at cost of $1,500 to use as a dairy barn.  He moved into Watertown in 1914 and to California in 1920.  Jacob Krull bought the farm for $13,600 and owned it, with exception of one year, until 1943.

Its National Register nomination asserts it is "truly a landmark in South Dakota", noting that it is located on one of the state's main
highways.

References

External links
 

Barns on the National Register of Historic Places in South Dakota
Buildings and structures in Codington County, South Dakota
Infrastructure completed in 1910
Round barns in South Dakota
National Register of Historic Places in Codington County, South Dakota